Meimoon Ghal'eh (literally "Monkey Castle" or "the Blessed Castle"), also known as Mehman Ghal'eh and Mobarak Ghal'eh, is one of several castle ruins scattered throughout the Qazvin area, in Iran.

Description
It sits in the south of the city of Qazvin, where has been always crowded, hence heavily eroded, and is almost 5000 square meters in footage. The remains indicate the castle to have had a large dome in its central section. All ceilings no longer exist. The fortification has a subterranean network of 3 east-west tunnels under the structure connected by a north–south tunnel. The two levels were connected via a helical staircase. The main gates must have been on the northern side, it is believed. Eight towers made of brick surrounded the castle. All evidence indicates this structure to have been a military fortress of some sorts.

See also
List of Iranian castles
Iranian architecture
History of Iran

Sources

External links

National works of Iran
Buildings and structures completed in the 8th century
Architecture in Iran
Castles in Iran
Sasanian castles
Qazvin
Buildings and structures in Qazvin Province